Black Jews are people who are both Black and Jewish. 

Some groups which are described as Black Jews include:

African-American Jews
Alliance of Black Jews, a now defunct organization
Black Hebrew Israelites
African Hebrew Israelites in Israel
Beta Israel, also known as Ethiopian Jews
Cochin Jews or Malabar Jews, a community of Indian Jews
Abayudaya, a Jewish community that lives in Eastern Africa
Igbo Jews, a Jewish community that lives in Western Africa
Lemba people, a Jewish community that lives in Western and Southern Africa
House of Israel (Ghana), a Jewish community that lives in Ghana

See also
History of the Jews in Africa